Tommy Smith (23 March 1914 – 18 July 1985) was  a former Australian rules footballer who played with Essendon and Footscray in the Victorian Football League (VFL).

Notes

External links 
		

1914 births
1985 deaths
Australian rules footballers from Victoria (Australia)
Essendon Football Club players
Western Bulldogs players